Mahmudabad Nemuneh (also Romanized as Maḩmūdābād Nemūneh; also known as Maḩmūdābād or Makhmudabad; formerly, Maḩmūdābād Sheykh ol Eslāmī and Shārīs) is a city in the Central District of Qazvin County, Qazvin Province, Iran. At the 2006 census its population was 19,669, in 4,842 families. The vast majority of the people and natives of this city are Azerbaijani Turks‌.

References 

Qazvin County
Cities in Qazvin Province